Ceres & Calypso in the Deep Time is the third and final studio album by American dream pop band Candy Claws, with lyrics provided by poet Jenn Morea. It was released on June 25, 2013, through Two Syllable Records. It is a concept album with a narrative about a seal-like beast and her human partner questing through the Mesozoic Era, which was adapted from a document entitled "Blood Ark", supposedly written in 1980 by paleontologist Hans-Dieter Sues. The album's title also alludes to Roman goddess Ceres and Greek goddess Calypso.

Background and composition 
Motivated by a future trip to Bates College where correspondence of Rachel Carson and Dorothy Freeman are housed, poet Jenn Morea had the idea of looking for music related to Carson's works to accompany her in this experience. Morea discovered Candy Claws' debut album In the Dream of the Sea Life, which was inspired by Carson's book The Sea Around Us. She initiated correspondence with Ryan Hover, and two months later, they decided to collaborate on the next Candy Claws album for which Morea would provide lyrics in form of poems. Hover shared with her the main idea for the album: "The story would take place during the Mesozoic Era and there would be 12 songs total with 4 songs representing each of the 3 time periods: Triassic, Jurassic and Cretaceous".

Morea listened ten rough mixes the band sent to her, she also studied visual representations of the era, recreations of dinosaur sounds, documentaries, and also read the band's previous albums lyrics to create continuity among their works. After Morea finished the lyrics, she allowed the band to choose which would be the chorus for each song. In order to emphasize Morea and Candy Claws collaboration, each track contains two titles: the first one represents the lyrics and the second one, in parentheses, the music.

New York City composer Bryan Senti provided orchestral arrangements on several tracks, completely built from Philip Glass sample library. Hover explains the compression on the tracks as follows: "we sent them back to the Mesozoic and the effects of time dilation, dimension inversion, instant fossilization, and magnetic thaw took their toll on the frequencies".

The main concept for the album was adapted from a document entitled "Blood Ark", supposedly written in 1980 by paleontologist Hans-Dieter Sues: Ceres the White Seal (performed by Karen McCormick) and Calypso the Girl (performed by Hank Bertholf) questing through the Deep Time (represented by Ryan Hover). For Morea, Ceres and Calypso represent the story of the friendship between Carson and Freeman, inspired by the letters they sent to each other.

The album was released on June 25, 2013. Next month, on July 19, Candy Claws released a "dual mono" (two separate channels that don't share sounds) version of the entire album, a non-vocal version with more clarity on instruments.

Critical reception

Pitchfork critic Ian Cohen considered Ceres & Calypso as "certainly one of 2013’s more unique records" and "immersive listening experience, but also a claustrophobic one." Cohen also further wrote: "It all leads to Ceres & Calypso feeling like concrete evidence of their [Candy Claws'] hippie cred, chock full of fantastic ideas and lacking just enough follow through." Philip Cosores of Diffuser.fm called the record "forward-thinking, intellectual, challenging, post-Animal Collective music doesn’t belong to these times" and stated that the band's "genre-hopping, while remaining true to their earthy psychedelic aesthetic, is enjoyable for any listener with the patience to take an indirect trip."

In a more mixed review, Consequence of Sound's Adam Kivel wrote that the album "would seem perfectly suited for a brain-melting, painstakingly detailed animated film, both in story and in its evocative soundtracking potential." Kivel also concluded: "Though often too big to fully comprehend, Ceres & Calypso is the kind of album you wish you could get lost in, perhaps by opening up a wardrobe and climbing right in."

The album gained attention from online music communities, including Album of the Year, where it is ranked 6th on the user-determined list of the best albums of 2013, and Rate Your Music, where it is ranked the 8th best album of 2013.

Track listing

Personnel
Album personnel as adapted from Bandcamp:
Candy Claws
 Hank Bertholf — performance
 Karen McCormick — performance
 Ryan Hover — performance, production

Other personnel
 Jenn Morea — lyrics
 Bryan Senti — orchestration (on tracks 1, 3, 5, 7, 9, and 12)

References

External links
 

2013 albums
Candy Claws albums
Dream pop albums by American artists
Concept albums
Shoegaze albums by American artists
Noise pop albums